This is a demography of the population of Bhutan including population density, ethnicity, education level, health of the populace, economic status, religious affiliations and other aspects of the population.

The Royal Government of Bhutan listed the country's population as 752,700 in 2003.

The Bhutanese numbers can be reconstructed from their 9th Five Year Plan documents, which lists the exact number of households in each gewog. If the Bhutanese refugee advocate groups are correct, a spot check of a southern gewog should show a massive under-reporting of population.

The CIA World Fact book number has since been adjusted with a note of former inconsistencies, and attributes the difference to the government not including the "first modern census of Bhutan, conducted in 2005". In the 1970s Bhutan was one of the most isolated countries in the world and nobody knew how many people lived there since no census had ever been taken.

Demographic statistics
The following demographic statistics are from the CIA World Factbook, unless otherwise indicated.

Population
708,427 (July 2011 est.)
716,896 (July 2012 est.)
750,125 (July 2016 est.)

Population by Sex and Age Group  

Median age
Total: 27.2 years
Male: 27.7 years
Female: 26.6 years (2016 est.)

Urbanization
urban population: 38.6% of total population (2015)
rate of urbanization: 3.69% annual rate of change (2010-15 est.)

Vital statistics
Below is a table of Bhutan vital statistics since 1950 published by the United Nations Department of Economic and Social Affairs.

Births and deaths
 (Government estimates)

Life expectancy at birth
Total population: 70.2 years
Male: 68.8 years
Female: 71.7 years (2017 est.)
Life expectancy at birth is 70.2 years, which is an increase from 66.3 years in 2005. Women (71.7 years) live longer than men (68.8).

In 2018, Prime Minister Tshering Tobgay announced that the average life expectancy at birth has surpassed 70.

Ethnic groups

Ngalop people and Sharchop people 63%
Lhotsampas (also known as Nepalis) 22%
Indigenous or migrant ethnic groups 15%

Religions

Tibetan Buddhism 75.3%
Hinduism 22.1%
Other 2.6%

Languages

 
Tshangla (sometimes referred to as Sharchopkha) 28%
Dzongkha (official) 24%
Nepali (locally referred as Lhotshamkha) 22%
Other 26%

References

External links
 

 

bn:ভুটানের জনপরিসংখ্যান